Petar Krsmanović (born 1 June 1990) is a Serbian professional volleyball player. He is a member of the Serbia national team. The 2019 European Champion, and a participant at the 2015 European Games held in Baku. At the professional club level, he plays for Vojvodina Novi Sad.

Honours

Clubs
 National championships
 2014/2015  Montenegrin Cup, with Budućnost Podgorica
 2014/2015  Montenegrin Championship, with Budućnost Podgorica
 2015/2016  Argentine Cup, with UPCN Vóley Club
 2015/2016  Argentine Championship, with UPCN Vóley Club

External links

 
 Player profile at LegaVolley.it   
 Player profile at Volleybox.net

1990 births
Living people
Sportspeople from Čačak
Serbian men's volleyball players
European champions for Serbia
European Games competitors for Serbia
Volleyball players at the 2015 European Games
Serbian expatriate sportspeople in Montenegro
Expatriate volleyball players in Montenegro
Serbian expatriate sportspeople in Argentina
Expatriate volleyball players in Argentina
Serbian expatriate sportspeople in Russia
Expatriate volleyball players in Russia
Serbian expatriate sportspeople in Italy
Expatriate volleyball players in Italy
Middle blockers
21st-century Serbian people